The Philippines competed at the 2009 World Games in Kaohsiung, Taiwan (with the host competing as Chinese Taipei), from 16 to 26 July 2009.

Medalists
Official

Invitational

Competitors

Bowling

Liza del Rosario won a bronze medal in the women's single event.

Chester King
Liza del Rosario

Cue sports

Dancesport

Powerlifting

Wushu

Wushu is an invitational sport.

Taolu

Sanda

References 

2009 in Philippine sport
Nations at the 2009 World Games
2009